Torquigener brevipinnis is a species of fish in the family Tetraodontidae. It is found in Australia, Indonesia, Japan, New Caledonia, Papua New Guinea, and the Philippines.

References

External links
 

Tetraodontidae
Fish described in 1903
Taxonomy articles created by Polbot